Vermilion Peak is a mountain in Colorado. It is one of 637 Colorado peaks above 13,000 feet (3962 m). It is located in the San Juan Range, and is the 74th highest mountain in Colorado. It is named Vermilion Peak because of the red-orange color it takes on when the sun shines on it. It is 9.7 miles ESE of Gladstone Peak.


See also

List of mountain peaks of North America
List of mountain peaks of the United States
List of mountain peaks of Colorado
List of Colorado county high points

References

External links

 
Map of Vermilion Peak

San Juan Mountains (Colorado)
Mountains of San Juan County, Colorado
Mountains of San Miguel County, Colorado
North American 4000 m summits
Mountains of Colorado